Sarosa epona is a moth in the subfamily Arctiinae. It was described by Paul Dognin in 1902. It is found in Venezuela.

References

External links
Natural History Museum Lepidoptera generic names catalog

Moths described in 1902
Arctiinae